is a Japanese professional shogi player ranked 6-dan.

Early life
Ishii was born on April 13, 1992, in Chiba, Chiba. He became interested in shogi after receiving a shogi set as a present from his grandfather, and started attending a shogi school run by shogi professional Kazuharu Shoshi as a kindergartener. Ishii failed the entrance examination for the Japan Shogi Association's apprentice school twice before finally passing it and being accepted into the school at the rank of 6-kyū in 2004 under the guidance of Shoshi. He was promoted to the rank of 1-dan in 2007, 3-dan in 2010, and finally obtained full professional status and the rank of 4-dan in October 2013 after winning the 53rd 3-dan League with a record of 15 wins and 3 losses.

Promotion history
Ishii's promotion history is as follows:
 6-kyū: September 2004
 3-dan: April 2010
 4-dan: October 1, 2013
 5-dan: October 30, 2017
 6-dan: June 5, 2020

References

External links
ShogiHub: Professional Player Info · Ishii, Kentaro

Japanese shogi players
Living people
Professional shogi players
Professional shogi players from Chiba Prefecture
People from Chiba (city)
1992 births